Anasyrma composed of ἀνά ana "up, against, back", and σύρμα syrma "skirt"; plural: anasyrmata, also called anasyrmos, is the gesture of lifting the skirt or kilt. It is used in connection with certain religious rituals, eroticism, and lewd jokes (see, for example, Baubo). The term is used in describing corresponding works of art.

Anasyrma may be a deliberately provocative self-exposing of one's naked genitals or buttocks. The famous example of the latter case is Aphrodite Kallipygos ("Aphrodite of the beautiful buttocks"). In other contexts, this gesture has an apotropaic character, that is, a means to ward off a supernatural enemy, or it may be a sign of mockery, analogous to mooning.

Greek antiquity

Ritual jesting and intimate exposure were common in the cults of Demeter and Dionysus, and figure in the celebration of the Eleusinian mysteries associated with these divinities. The mythographer Apollodorus says that Iambe's jesting was the reason for the practice of ritual jesting at the Thesmophoria, a festival celebrated in honor of Demeter and Persephone. In other versions of the myth of Demeter, the goddess is received by a woman named Baubo, a crone who makes her laugh by exposing herself, in a ritual gesture called anasyrma ("lifting [of skirts]"). A set of statuettes from Priene, a Greek city on the west coast of Asia Minor, are usually identified as "Baubo" figurines, representing the female body as the face conflated with the lower part of the abdomen. These appeared as counterparts to the phalluses decorated with eyes, mouth, and sometimes legs, that appeared on vase paintings and were made as statuettes.

Terracotta hermaphrodite figurines in the so-called anasyromenos pose, with breasts and a long garment lifted to reveal a phallus, have been found from Sicily to Lesbos, dating back to the late Classical and early Hellenistic period. The anasyromenos pose, however, was not invented in the 4th century BCE, figures of this type drew on a much earlier eastern iconographic tradition employed for female divinities. Ancient literature suggests that the figures represent the androgynous Cypriot deity Aphroditus (possibly a form of Astarte), whose cult was introduced into mainland Greece between the 5th–4th century BCE. The revealed phallus was believed to have apotropaic magical powers, averting the evil eye or invidia and bestowing good luck.

Apotropaic effect of nakedness
Many historical references suggest that anasyrma had dramatic or supernatural effect—positive or negative. Pliny the Elder wrote that a menstruating woman who uncovers her body can scare away hailstorms, whirlwinds and lightning. If she strips naked and walks around a field of wheat, caterpillars, worms and beetles fall off the heads. Even when not menstruating, she can lull a storm out at sea by stripping.

According to folklore, women lifted their skirts to chase off enemies in Ireland and China. A story from The Irish Times (September 23, 1977) reported a potentially violent incident involving several men, which was averted by a woman exposing her genitals to the attackers. According to Balkan folklore, when it rained too much, women would run into the fields and lift their skirts to scare the gods and end the rain. Maimonides also mentions this ritual to ward off the rain while expressing his disapproval. Stripping away clothing was perceived as creating a "raw" state closer to nature than society, facilitating interaction with supernatural entities. In Jean de La Fontaine's Nouveaux Contes (1674), a demon is repulsed by the sight of a woman lifting her skirt. Associated carvings, called sheela na gigs, were common on medieval churches in northern Europe and the British Isles.

In some nations of Africa, a woman stripping naked and displaying herself is still considered a curse and a means to ward off evil.

In Nigeria, during mass protests against the petroleum industry, women displayed themselves in anasyrma. Leymah Gbowee used anasyrma when trying to bring peace during the Second Liberian Civil War.

See also

 Can-can
 Exhibitionism (Martymachlia)
 Indecent exposure
 Mooning
 Nudity and protest
 Upskirt

References

Sources
 
 Weber-Lehmann, C. (1997/2000)) "Anasyrma und Götterhochzeit. Ein orientalisches Motiv im nacharchaischen Etrurien", in: Akten des Kolloquiums zum Thema: Der Orient und Etrurien. Zum Phänomen des 'Orientalisierens' im westlichen Mittelmeerraum. Tübingen.
 Dexter, Miriam Robbins, and Victor H. Mair. (2010) Sacred Display: Divine and Magical Female Figures of Eurasia. Cambria Press.

Further reading
 Blackledge, Catherine (2020). Raising the Skirt: The Unsung Power of the Vagina. Hachette UK, ISBN 147461583X
 Hairston, Julia L. (Autumn 2000) "Skirting the Issue: Machiavelli's Caterina Sforza", Renaissance Quarterly. Vol. 53, No. 3., pp. 687–712.
 Marcovich, M. (September 1986) "Demeter, Baubo, Iacchus, and a Redactor", Vigiliae Christianae. Vol. 40, No. 3. pp. 294–301.
 Morris, Ellen F. (2007). "Sacred and Obscene Laughter in 'The Contendings of Horus and Seth', in Egyptian Inversions of Everyday Life, and in the Context of Cultic Competition". In Schneider, Thomas; Szpakowska, Kasia. Egyptian Stories: A British Egyptological Tribute to Alan B. Lloyd on the Occasion of His Retirement. Ugarit-Verlag. 
 Säflund, Gösta. (1963) Aphrodite Kallipygos, Almqvist & Wiksell, Stockholm, Sweden.
 Stoichita, Victor I.; Anna Maria Coderch. (1999) Goya: The Last Carnival, Reaktion Books. pp. 118. 
 Thomson De Grummond, Nancy. (2006) Etruscan Myth, Sacred History, and Legend, University of Pennsylvania Museum of Archaeology. 
 Zeitlin, Froma I. (1982) Cultic models of the female: Rites of Dionysos and Demeter, Arethusa. pp. 144–145.

External links
 
 
 Of Skirts and Figs and Sheela-na-gigs (Naples: Life, Death & Miracles)
 Anasyromene figurines   (British Museum Collections)
 Anasyromene figurines   (Museum of Fine Arts, Boston)
 Warding Off Danger: Protective Power of the Vulva
 Gymnastique Pourquoi les vulves font-elles peur? - Arte

Iconography
Rituals
Nudity
Gestures